Roy Sharma (born 14 July 1933) is a Singaporean field hockey player. He competed in the men's tournament at the 1956 Summer Olympics.

References

External links
 
 

1933 births
Living people
Singaporean male field hockey players
Olympic field hockey players of Singapore
Field hockey players at the 1956 Summer Olympics
Place of birth missing (living people)
Singaporean sportspeople of Indian descent
20th-century Singaporean people